Alburnus tarichi, known as the tarek, pearl mullet, Van fish or Van shah kuli, is a species of cyprinid fish, found only in Turkey, where it is the only fish known to inhabit Lake Van. It is endemic to the Lake Van basin.

The tarek is the 'jewel' of Lake Van in Turkey. Found nowhere else in the world, this fish thrives in the lake's salty and carbonated waters, which are inhospitable to other forms of fresh water and marine fish. In May and June of each year it travels upstream through the lake's tributaries to lay eggs, flying through the air like salmon.

Many locals have become accustomed to sticking out bags and catching fish as they jump out of the water, catching so many fish in May–June that they do not have to fish for the rest of the year. Locals prefer to catch the fish during reproduction season, when the females are filled with eggs, which are considered a delicacy in the town and region of Erciş. YYÜ and Doğa Gözcüleri Derneği have been developing a conservation strategy since 1997 (Sari, 2012). Despite a government ban on fishing during reproduction season, this kind of fishing has become a big business. In the 1960s, 600 tons of the fish were harvested annually; today that figure is 15,000 tons. The species was considered Endangered on the IUCN Red List in 1994, but was downgraded to Near Threatened in 2014.

References

External links

Informations and Images www.incikefali.net
Turkey - Sustainable Fishing and Consumption of Pearl Mullet 

tarichi
Fish described in 1814
Endemic fauna of Turkey
Lake Van
Taxa named by Johann Anton Güldenstädt